Exyrias is a genus of gobies mostly native to marine waters of the Indian Ocean and the western Pacific Ocean with one freshwater species (E. volcanus) known from the Philippines.

Species
There are currently five recognized species in this genus:
 Exyrias akihito G. R. Allen & J. E. Randall, 2005
 Exyrias belissimus (J. L. B. Smith, 1959) (Mud Reef-goby)
 Exyrias ferrarisi Murdy, 1985
 Exyrias puntang (Bleeker, 1851) (Puntang Goby)
 Exyrias volcanus (Herre, 1927)

References

 
Gobiinae
Taxa named by David Starr Jordan